Chantecler may refer to:
Chantecler, the rooster in the epic tale of Reynard
Chantecler (chicken), a breed of chicken
Chantecler (play), a play by Edmond Rostand
Chantecler (record label), a Brazilian subsidiary of Warner Music Group
Chantecler (Luxury jewelry) a luxury jewelry brand founded in 1947, originally from Capri-Italy
Ski Chantecler, a ski station in the Laurentians of Quebec in Canada near Montreal
Le Chantecler, a former ski resort in the Laurentians of Quebec in Canada near Montreal, see List of former ski areas of Quebec

See also
Chanticleer (disambiguation)